Once Upon a Mattress is a musical comedy with music by Mary Rodgers, lyrics by Marshall Barer, and book by Jay Thompson, Dean Fuller, and Marshall Barer. It opened off-Broadway in May 1959, and then moved to Broadway. The play was written as a humorous adaptation of the 1835 Hans Christian Andersen fairy tale "The Princess and the Pea".

Once Upon a Mattress was first written as a shorter play at the Tamiment adult summer camp resort. The play was later expanded for the Broadway stage. Initial reviews of the play were mixed, but critics and actors alike were surprised by the show's enduring popularity. Once Upon a Mattress is a popular choice for high school drama programs and community theater groups.

Productions
The original production opened on May 11, 1959, at the off-Broadway Phoenix Theatre (now transformed into a multi-plex cinema, located on the Lower East Side), transferred later in the year to Broadway at the Alvin Theatre (now known as the Neil Simon Theatre) and then to several other Broadway theaters, finally playing at the St. James Theatre, for a total run of 470 performances. The musical was directed by George Abbott and choreographed by Joe Layton. Once Upon A Mattress marked the Broadway debut of later stage and TV personality Carol Burnett, who originated the role of Princess Winnifred. Also featured were Joseph Bova, Allen Case, Jack Gilford and Matt Mattox. Jane White played the role of Queen Aggravain. Jack Gilford played King Sextimus The Silent and was later replaced by Will Lee, Gilford's standby, prior to the show's move to Broadway. The musical received a Tony Award nomination for Best Musical as well as a Best Leading Actress nomination for Carol Burnett. When Burnett left the show, veteran television actress Ann B. Davis took over the leading role.

In August 1960, soon after the closing of the Broadway run, rehearsals were called for a seven-month US tour which would move from city to city by train, truck and bus. Jack Sydow stepped from his role as King into the position of Director. Dody Goodman played Winnifred at first, then Imogene Coca picked up the role. Carol Arthur understudied them both, and played the Nightingale of Samarkand. Fritzi Burr played the Queen and Buster Keaton played the King. Keaton's wife Eleanor was placed in the chorus. Keaton warmed up to the cast of younger actors, dispensing grandfatherly advice and chocolates freely.

A London production of the musical opened at the Adelphi Theatre on September 20, 1960, where it ran for 24 performances. The cast included Jane Connell as Winnifred, Robin Hunter as Dauntless, Milo O'Shea as the King, Bill Kerr as the Wizard and Max Wall as the Jester. EMI Records took the cast into the recording studio and recorded a London Cast album. This was issued on an HMV LP. The album was included on a CD titled “Once upon a Mattress” issued by Sepia Records in 2010.
 
A Broadway revival opened on December 19, 1996, at the Broadhurst Theatre and closed on May 31, 1997, after 188 regular performances and 35 previews. It starred Sarah Jessica Parker as Winnifred, David Aaron Baker as Dauntless, Lewis Cleale as Sir Harry,  Heath Lamberts as the King, Tom Alan Robbins as the Wizard, David Hibbard as the Jester, Tom Alan Robbins as Master Merton and Jane Krakowski as Lady Larken. The production was nominated for the 1997 Tony Award for Best Revival of a Musical.

The musical opened Off-Broadway, produced by the Transport Group, at the Abrons Arts Center on December 13, 2015, for a limited run which ended on January 3, 2016. Directed by Jack Cummings III, the cast featured Jackie Hoffman as Princess Winnifred, John Epperson as Queen Aggravain, Jessica Fontana as Lady Larken, David Greenspan as The King, and Hunter Ryan Herdlicka as The Minstrel.

Television adaptations

1964
The first television adaptation was aired on June 3, 1964, on CBS. The production was videotaped in black and white in front of a live audience and featured Burnett, Bova, Gilford, and White from the original Broadway cast, as well as new principals Bill Hayes as the Minstrel, Shani Wallis as Lady Larken and Elliott Gould (in his first appearance on any screen) as the Jester. Due to the reduced running time of 90 minutes, several songs and scenes were either cut or shortened. The conflict concerning Sir Harry and Lady Larken was downplayed to that they were married in secret.

1972
The second television adaptation was broadcast on December 12, 1972, on CBS. This production, videotaped in color, included original Broadway cast members Burnett, Gilford and White, and also featured Bernadette Peters as Lady Larken, Ken Berry as Prince Dauntless, Ron Husmann as Harry, and Wally Cox as The Jester. It was directed by Ron Field and Dave Powers. Again, several songs were eliminated and characters were combined or altered.  Since the parts of the Minstrel and the Wizard were cut from this adaptation, a new prolog was written with Burnett singing "Many Moons Ago" as a bedtime story.  In 2016, the special was included as a bonus feature on the DVD Carol + 2: The Original Queens of Comedy.

2005

The third television version, which aired on December 18, 2005, on ABC in the United States as part of The Wonderful World of Disney and was released on DVD two days later, starred Carol Burnett as Queen Aggravain, Denis O'Hare as Prince Dauntless, Tom Smothers as King Sextimus, Tracey Ullman as Princess Winnifred, Zooey Deschanel as Lady Larken, and Matthew Morrison as Sir Harry. It was directed by Kathleen Marshall and executive produced by Burnett and Martin Tudor. The beginning portion, cut from the DVD release, features a girl, who meets Cinderella, telling her mother the story of that story. The Minstrel was cut from this version, negating and also cutting most of the songs featuring the Minstrel except "Normandy," which was changed to describe Larken's and Sir Harry's honeymoon. Additional plot changes include the King hiding to overhear the Queen and Wizard plotting the test, then collaborating with the Jester, Larken, and Harry.

Plot

Act I
A fictional medieval kingdom in 15th-Century Europe is ruled by the devious Queen Aggravain and the mute King Sextimus the Silent. King Sextimus suffers from a curse that can only be reversed "when the mouse devours the hawk." The Minstrel sings of the Princess and the Pea ("Many Moons Ago"), but reveals the story to be fake, though he knows the true tale because he was there when it happened. The princess in the story is not the first princess tested to see if she is worthy of marrying Prince Dauntless the Drab—she is the thirteenth princess. The day the Minstrel arrives, the Queen, alongside her confidante, the Wizard, is testing Princess #12 with an unfair quiz. To the Queen's delight, the princess misses the last question: "What was the middle name of the daughter-in-law of the best friend of the blacksmith who forged the sword that killed the Beast?" and is given a rubber chicken by Sir Studley. The populace of the castle complains about an unjust law levied by Queen Aggravain: "Throughout the land no one may wed, 'till Dauntless shares his wedding bed."  However, every petitioning princess is sent away after failing unfair tests devised by the Queen. It seems that no one is good enough to marry Prince Dauntless ("An Opening for a Princess").

The crisis escalates when the leading knight of the realm, Sir Harry, discovers that his girlfriend, Lady Larken, is pregnant. Though Lady Larken says that she will run away so he will never have to face embarrassment and the loss of his station, Sir Harry decides that he will set out to find a princess himself ("In a Little While"). He petitions the Queen who immediately says no, but when Dauntless manages to speak up and beg, she gives in.

The Minstrel tells the audience that in the original story, the princess arrived at the castle on a stormy night ("Many Moons Ago - Reprise"), but it is not night at all-and the princess only looked as though she went through a storm. Princess Winnifred the Woebegone, a brash and unrefined princess from the marshlands, was so eager to arrive that she swam the castle moat. She immediately charms Dauntless, Studley, and the knights and most of the kingdom ("Shy"). However, she also earns the utter loathing of the evil Queen, who vows to stop her.

The King discovers Larken's pregnancy and pantomimes this to his confidantes, the Minstrel and the Jester. He tells them to not say a word, but they both are more worried about the King letting it slip, because even though he is mute, he can still communicate ("The Minstrel, the Jester, and I"). Later, the Queen, assisted by the Wizard, designs a test for Winnifred based on something they are sure she has not got at all—sensitivity. They will place a tiny pea beneath twenty thick downy mattresses. If Winnifred is unable to sleep due to the pea, then she will be sensitive enough to marry Dauntless ("Sensitivity").

Meanwhile, Winnifred tells Dauntless and the ladies in waiting about her home in the swamp ("The Swamps of Home") and meets the King, and they immediately like each other. Then, after spilling a purple vase filled with fresh new baby's breath, Winnifred is caught cleaning the mess by Lady Larken who mistakes her for a chambermaid. Soon Harry gets mad at Larken for her mistake and they get in a fight. Larken vows that she will run far far away where she will never see him again.
 
The King, the Minstrel and the Jester catch Larken trying to run away, and they try to stop her but in the end decide to help her escape to Normandy ("Normandy"). Later that night, the Queen throws a ball so Winnifred can dance the most exhausting dance in the world, "The Spanish Panic".  The Queen hopes that Winnifred will tire herself, but the plan fails. Winnifred is the last one standing as everyone collapses from exhaustion at the dance's climax. She asks Dauntless to try to give her a clue as to what the test might be, but he's not sure. He brings out a huge barbell that one of the princesses was asked to lift, but even he cannot lift it. Winnifred does easily and Dauntless admits that he loves her. Winnifred mentions that her nickname is Fred and Dauntless sings of his love for her as she practices numerous tasks she might have to do for the test, including singing, dancing, wrestling, acting, playing the Minstrel's lute, pantomiming and drinking herself unconscious ("Song of Love").

Act II
Later that night the Queen leads the knights and ladies as they carry the twenty mattresses to Fred's room ("Quiet"), and she catches the Minstrel, the Jester, the King, and Larken (disguised in Dauntless' clothes) running away. The Minstrel tries to protect Larken by saying he was escaping with Larken against her will. The Queen declares that the Minstrel will be banished by daybreak. Fred and Dauntless study for the test, and Fred convinces Larken to fix things with Harry. Larken leaves to find Harry, Dauntless bids Fred goodnight, and now she is left alone. While studying a fairytale, she complains about how other fairy tale princesses had it easy and how she wants to live happily ever after ("Happily Ever After").  King Sextimus has a man to man talk  with Dauntless about the birds and the bees completely in pantomime ("Man to Man Talk"). The Jester and Minstrel trick the Wizard into telling them of the test and the Jester reminisces about his father's dancing days ("Very Soft Shoes").

Sir Harry and Lady Larken run into each other and they confess that their love is stronger than ever ("Yesterday I Loved You"). When Fred is finally ready for bed, the Queen brings in various people, including the Nightingale of Samarkand, to sing her to sleep ("Nightingale Lullaby") but Winnifred is kept wide awake. It seems that there is some "lump" under the mattresses that is keeping her from relaxing. She starts counting sheep.

Dauntless dresses in his finest to see Winnifred pass the test, but the Queen tells him to his great disappointment that the test has already happened and what it was. Dauntless is heartbroken until Winnifred drowsily stumbles into the throne room while still counting sheep. Everyone is ecstatic that Winnifred has passed but the Queen insists that Dauntless should not throw himself away on Winnifred.  Dauntless has had enough of his mother's attempts to control his life and finally yells, "I told you to shut up!".  The curse on King Sextimus is lifted (the "mouse"- Dauntless, has metaphorically devoured the "hawk"- Queen Aggravain). Aggravain discovers that she cannot talk and the King can, so Dauntless and Winnifred are free to be married. The King forces the Queen to hop, skip, and jump around the room to everyone's amusement, and with this, she is forced to step down.

Finally the real reason why Winnifred passed the test is revealed. After learning about the test, the King, Minstrel, and Jester stuffed the mattresses full of weapons, jousting equipment, and other sharp items.  All the items are removed by the Jester in the finale ("Finale"). After the items are removed Winnifred still has trouble sleeping until Dauntless takes the pea out from under the mattress, when she then falls asleep almost immediately. Everyone, in classic fairy-tale tradition, lives happily ever after.

Characters 

 Prince Dauntless - The son of Queen Aggravain and King Sextimus, who is slightly childlike, but easily falls in love with the princess just as he has with the many that have come before. 
 Princess Winnifred - The princess that comes from the swamp, who is brought to the castle by Sir Harry. She is also childlike and also much less refined than the rest of the castle's residents. She was far out of where the kingdom had searched for princesses before, but Sir Harry was noble enough to travel to find one like her. 
 Queen Aggravain - The wife of King Sextimus, who makes every princess take the extremely hard tests she creates. She is arrogant and full of herself and is in constant disagreement with the King despite his not being able to talk. 
 King Sextimus - The (cursed) husband of Queen Aggravain, and very good friend of the Jester and Minstral. He cannot speak and communicates via hand gestures before he speaks at the end and allows for the prince and princess to be married. 
 The Minstrel - The narrator of the musical, who helps the king and the jester many times, and all are very good friends. He is also very clever in his way of getting things, but is kind and smart with the way he does it. 
 The Jester - A complicated character of sorts, who is meant to be funny but instead is more sad or annoying than humorous. The jester is great friends with the king and the minstrel, and translates for the king frequently. 
 Sir Harry - The noble knight of the kingdom, who is in love with Lady Larken. He is the one who searches for the Princess Winnifred, after passing the mountains and the badlands. His true reason for bringing a princess to the kingdom was so that he and Lady Larken could be married, as well as all the rest of the kingdom. 
 Lady Larken - The very kind and refined nobility, who wishes to be married with Sir Harry, and carries his child. She believes at first that Princess Winnifred was a chambermaid, and still voiced that she did afterwards. She attempts to escape the kingdom after breaking up with Sir Harry for a night, but returns to him and they fall in love again ("Yesterday I Loved You"). 
 Wizard - A very quiet person, who usually keeps to himself, although he is basically the Queen's minion, and puts her tests for the princesses in action. He does like the Jester and Minstrel though, and they bond over his past with the Jester's father.
 Ensemble - The men and women of the kingdom, who wish to be married to each other throughout the play. They also highly encourage the prince to get married because they cannot be married until the prince marries a princess.

Musical numbers 

Act I
Overture - Orchestra
Many Moons Ago - Minstrel
An Opening For a Princess - Prince Dauntless, Lady Larken, Ensemble
In a Little While - Sir Harry, Lady Larken
In a Little While (reprise) - Sir Harry, Lady Larken
On a Stormy Night - Minstrel
Shy - Princess Winnifred, Knights and Ladies
The Minstrel, the Jester, and I - Minstrel, Jester
Sensitivity - Queen Aggravain, Wizard
The Swamps of Home - Princess Winnifred, Prince Dauntless, Ladies-in-Waiting
Normandy - Minstrel, Jester, Larken
Spanish Panic - Orchestra, Ensemble
Song of Love - Prince Dauntless, Princess Winnifred, Ensemble

Act II
Entr'acte - Orchestra
Quiet - Queen Aggravain, Ensemble
Goodnight, Sweet Princess - Prince Dauntless (Revival only)
Happily Ever After - Princess Winnifred
Man to Man Talk - Prince Dauntless
Very Soft Shoes - Jester 
Yesterday I Loved You - Sir Harry, Lady Larken
Nightingale Lullaby - Nightingale of Samarkand
Finale - Prince Dauntless, Princess Winnifred, Queen Aggravain, King Sextimus, Ensemble

Characters and original cast

Notable Broadway cast replacements 
 Winnifred – Ann B. Davis

Awards and nominations

Original Broadway production

1996 Broadway revival

References

External links 

 
 
 
 
 Once Upon a Mattress plot summary and character descriptions on StageAgent

1959 musicals
1964 in American television
1972 in American television
2005 in American television
Broadway musicals
Musicals based on works by Hans Christian Andersen
Musical television films
Musical television specials
Musicals based on secular traditions
Works based on The Princess and the Pea
Television shows based on works by Hans Christian Andersen